Mount Pleasant Cemetery is a cemetery located in Melfort, Saskatchewan, Canada

Notable interments

Medical personalities
 Alfred Schmitz Shadd (1869–1915), Saskatchewan's first black doctor

Politicians
 George Dyer Weaver (1908–1986), Member of Parliament for Churchill, metallurgical engineer

External links
  Mount Pleasant Cemetery

Cemeteries in Saskatchewan